Tomáš Zohorna (born 3 January 1988, in Chotěboř) is a Czech professional ice hockey player. He is currently under contract with IK Oskarshamn in the Swedish Hockey League (SHL). He has two brothers, Radim and Hynek. They are hockey players too, they used to play for HC Kometa Brno.

He played major junior hockey in the Quebec Major Junior Hockey League with the Drummondville Voltigeurs. Undrafted by a National Hockey League club, he turned professional with HC Pardubice in the Czech Extraliga during the 2007–08 Czech Extraliga season.

Career statistics

Regular season and playoffs

International

References

External links
 

1988 births
Amur Khabarovsk players
Czech ice hockey forwards
Drummondville Voltigeurs players
HC Dynamo Pardubice players
HC Chrudim players
Living people
People from Chotěboř
Ice hockey players at the 2018 Winter Olympics
Ice hockey players at the 2022 Winter Olympics
Olympic ice hockey players of the Czech Republic
Sportspeople from the Vysočina Region
Czech expatriate ice hockey players in Canada
Czech expatriate ice hockey players in Sweden
Czech expatriate ice hockey players in Russia